Johann Friedrich Alberti (11 January 1642 – 14 June 1710) was a German composer and organist.

Alberti was born in Tönning, Schleswig.  He received his musical training in Leipzig from Werner Fabricius and in Dresden from Vincenzo Albrici. Then he worked as an organist in Merseburg cathedral until his departure in 1698 caused by the paralysis of his right hand because of a stroke. His pupil Georg Friedrich Kauffmann succeeded him as a princely Saxon townsman and cathedral organist at the court of the Saxon duke and Merseburg Cathedral.

Alberti's works include chorale preludes, 35 choral arrangements, 12 ricercati (lost) and various sacred works.  He died, aged 68, in Merseburg, Saxony-Anhalt.

List of selected works

Gelobet seist du
Herzlich lieb hab ich dich, o Herr, on Schalling's hymn
O lux beata Trinitas or Der du bist drei in Einigkeit
Te Deum

External links

Biography at bach-cantatas.com

1642 births
1710 deaths
People from Tönning
German Baroque composers
18th-century classical composers
German male classical composers
18th-century German composers
18th-century German male musicians
German classical composers